Marko Savić (Serbian Cyrillic Марко Caвић; born 19 July 1984, in Belgrade) is a Serbian professional football coach and a former player.

He previously played for some minor Serbian clubs, FK Grafičar Beograd, FK Žarkovo and FK Mladi Obilić Beograd before moving to Bosnia to play with FK Sarajevo. Between 2006 and 2009 he played in Bulgaria, first with PFC Rilski Sportist Samokov in 2006-07, and later with Spartak Varna between 2007 and 2009. In summer 2009, he returned to Serbia and signed with former top league club FK Radnički Obrenovac.

External sources
 Profile and stats at Srbijafudbal.
 Profile at R.Obrenovac website.

1984 births
Living people
Footballers from Belgrade
Serbian footballers
Serbian expatriate footballers
Serbian football managers
FK Mladi Obilić players
FK Radnički Obrenovac players
FK Sarajevo players
Expatriate footballers in Bosnia and Herzegovina
PFC Spartak Varna players
First Professional Football League (Bulgaria) players
Expatriate footballers in Bulgaria
Association football forwards
FCI Levadia Tallinn managers
Expatriate football managers in Estonia
Serbian expatriate football managers
Serbian expatriate sportspeople in Bosnia and Herzegovina
Serbian expatriate sportspeople in Bulgaria
Serbian expatriate sportspeople in Estonia